Jörg Woithe (born 11 April 1963) is a German former swimmer. He competed at the 1980 Summer Olympics in Moscow and won a gold medal in the 100 m freestyle and a silver medal in the 4 × 200 m freestyle relay; he finished fourth in the 200 m freestyle and 4 × 100 m freestyle relay.

Between 1981 and 1987 he won two gold, seven silver and five bronze medals at the world and European championships.

After retiring from swimming he received a degree from the German Institute of Physical Education and Sport in Leipzig / Germany ( Deutsche Hochschule für Körperkultur und Sport - DHfK ) via distance learning. He then worked as a swimming coach, and was also employed by companies producing swimming articles and high-performance lubricants. In 2012 he was hired by the Iranian swimming national team.

References

External links

1963 births
Living people
Swimmers from Berlin
East German male freestyle swimmers
Olympic swimmers of East Germany
Swimmers at the 1980 Summer Olympics
Olympic gold medalists for East Germany
World Aquatics Championships medalists in swimming
European Aquatics Championships medalists in swimming
Medalists at the 1980 Summer Olympics
Olympic silver medalists for East Germany
Olympic gold medalists in swimming
Olympic silver medalists in swimming